Valle di Cadore is a comune (municipality) in the province of Belluno in the Italian region of Veneto, located about  north of Venice and about  northeast of Belluno.

The main attraction is the Renaissance Palazzo Costantini Lanza.

History 
Known simply as Valle until 1867, it was a castrum of the Romans, who also had a road built here to connect to the Via Claudia Augusta Altinate.

Titian, the painter, was born here around 1477.

During the War of the League of Cambrai, in 1508, it was the seat of a battle of the Venetians and the Cadorines against the Habsburg Holy Roman Emperor Maximilian I.

International relations

Twin towns / Sister cities 
  Claro, Switzerland

References 

Cities and towns in Veneto